

Diocese of Melbourne, West and South Australia, New Zealand and All Oceania

The diocese is currently under the guidance of Pope Tawadros II. The diocese territory includes Victoria, Tasmania, ACT, South Australia, Western Australia, New Zealand and All Oceania.

The following is a list of the churches under the diocese and the priests that serve in each church:

Victoria
St Athanasius; Donvale 
Fr Antonious Guirguis
Fr Tadawos Abdelmalak
Fr Gregorios Awad
Archangel Michael Monastery for Nuns; Woodend
Nun Antonia St Demiana
Archangel Michael & St. Anthony; Oakleigh
Fr Daniel Ghabrial (Vicar General)
Fr Luke Sorsok
Fr Angelos Raphael
St. Bishoy & St. Shenouda; Bulleen
Fr Mina Issac
Fr Shenouda Botros
Fr Jonathan Alexander
St. George; St. Albans
Fr Thomas Abdelmalek
Fr Marcos Yassa
Fr Samuel Elias
Fr Peter Agaibi
Fr Anthony Mikhail 
St. Mark; Preston
Fr Youhanna Samuel
Fr Girgis El-Antony
Fr George Farag
St. Mary; Kensington
Fr Tadros Sharobeam
Fr Habib-Girgis Younan
Fr Michael Salib
Fr Kyrillos Tawadros
Fr John Makari
St Mina & St Marina; Hallam
Fr Abanoub Attalla
Fr Timotheous Ghabrial
Fr Isaac El-Antony
Fr Athanasius Attia
Fr Elijah Fanous
Fr Isaac Wissa
St John & St Verena; Armadale
Fr Mark Attalla
Fr Sourial Youssef
Fr Daniel Roushdy
Fr Andrew Alexander
St Verena & St Bishoy; Eporo Tower
Fr Arsanios Saleeb  
St. Macarius the Great; Yarrambat
Fr Stephen Mankarious
St. Paul the Apostle; Bendigo
Fr Moses Curley
St. Philopater Mercurius, Melton
Fr David Kamel
St. Karas & St. Severus of Antioch; Pakenham
Fr SilS Abdelnour
St. Moses, Geelong
Fr Peter Agaibi
Fr Habib-Girgis Younan 
St. Pope Kyrellos VI, Traralgon
Fr Abanoub Attalla

General Priests 
Fr Paul Awad (Diocese Secretary)

Australian Capital Territory
St Mark Coptic Orthodox Church; Kaleen
Fr Michael Zamer

South Australia
St. Mary & St. Bishoy; Cowandilla
 Fr Philopos Boghdadi
 Fr Abraam El-Baramousy
 Fr Bishoy Youhanna
St. George & St. Shenouda; Huntfield Heights

Western Australia
St. Mark & St. George; Wangara
Fr Titus El-Baramousy
St. Mary & Archangel Michael, East Victoria Park
Fr Abram Abdelmalek
Fr John Rizkallah
Fr Samuel Boctor
Fr Mathious Andrawos

Tasmania
St. Demiana & St. Abraam; Newstead
St. Mary; Hobart
Fr Daniel Roushdy

New Zealand
St. Mark; Auckland
Fr Bishoy Mikhael (Vicar of New Zealand)
St. Mary & St Athanasius; Christchurch
Fr Barsom Ibrahem
Archangel Michael; Dunedin
Fr Felimoun El-Baramousy
St George; Timaru
Fr Marteros Morcos
St Mary & St Mina; Wellington
Fr Hedra El-Baramousy

Fiji
St. Mark; Suva
Fr Raphael Bassily
Fr David Tokoniono
Deacon George
St. Mary; Taveuni
Fr Antony Lemuelu
Deacon Mina
St. George; Nadi
Fr John Abdelmalek
St. Rowais; Nadi
Fr John Abdelmalek
Fr Sourial Youssef

Solomon Islands
St. Mary & Archangel Gabriel; Auki
Fr Antony Lemuelu
Fr Mark Attalla

Monastery of St Anthony, Heathcote, Victoria
It is the first Coptic monastery to be established in Australia. The monastery is currently under the direct jurisdiction of Bishop Suriel, Bishop of the Diocese of Melbourne and affiliated regions.(currently relieved of eparchial shepherding) The abbot of the monastery is the bishop of the diocese. There are a total of two monks who live and worship in the monastery:
Fr Matta El-Baramousy
Fr Raphael Abba Antony

Diocese of Sydney, New South Wales, Queensland, Northern Territory and all East Asia 

The diocese was placed under the guidance of Archbishop Angaelos of London by Papal Decree 13/2021. 
Bishop Daniel is the bishop of the diocese and has overseen the expansion of the churches, services and the flock of the diocese since his ordination in 2002. The diocese territory includes Sydney, New South Wales, Queensland, Northern Territory, Thailand, Singapore, and all East Asia. The following is a list of the churches under the diocese and the priests serving in each church:

New South Wales
Archangel Michael & St. Bishoy; Mount Druitt
Fr Antonios Kaldas
Fr Botros Morkos
Fr Gabriel Yassa
Fr Bishoy Botros
Fr Karas Faragalla
Pope Cyril VI & St. Archdeacon Habib Girgis; Monterey
Fr Youssef Fanous
Fr Joseph Ghattas
St. Abraam; Long Point 
Fr Mina Diskoros
Fr Paula Balamon
Fr Paul Fanous
St. Antonious & St. Paula; Guildford
Fr Tadros Simon
Fr Shenouda Mansour
Fr Makarios Ibrahim
Fr Suriel Hanna
Fr Seraphim Sidaros
St. Barbara & Abba Nofer the Hermit; Bradbury
Fr Thomas Dos
St. Demiana & St. Athanasius; Punchbowl
Fr Hanna Gad (Diocese Secretary)
Fr George Nakhil
St. George; Kensington
Fr Markos Tawfik
Fr Rafael Iskander
Fr Matthew Attia (Diocese Vicar)
Fr Kyrillos Farag
St. George & Prince Tadros; Liverpool
Fr Anthony Morgan
Fr Salib Salib
St. John; South Hurstville

St. John the Baptist & Elijah the Prophet; Dubbo

St. Karas the Hermit; Leumeah
Fr Augustinos El-Antony
St. Luke; Sylvania
Fr Daniel Fanous
Fr Samuel Fanous
St. Mark; Arncliffe
Fr Yacoub Magdy
Fr Augustinos Nada
Fr Jonathan Ishak
Fr Mark Basily
Fr Michael Fanous
Fr Elijah Iskander
Fr Anthony Sharkawi
St. Mary & Archangel Michael, The Entrance
Fr Michael Fanous
St. Mary & Archangel Michael, Coffs Harbour

St. Mary & Pope Kyrillos VI, Cundletown (Taree)
Fr Karas Faltaous
St. Mary, St. Anthony & St. Paul, Orange
St. Mary & St. George; Beresfield (Newcastle)
Fr John Ghandour
St. Mary & St. John the Beloved; Wagga Wagga
Fr Yostos Wasif
St. Mary & St. Joseph; Peakhurst
Fr Moussa Soliman
Fr Stefanos El-Antony
Fr Luke Malek
Fr Marcos Tadros
St. Mary & St. Luke, Point Clare (Gosford)
Fr Georgious Ramandious
St. Mary & St. Karas, Port Macquarie
Fr Karas Faltaous
St. Mary & St. Cosman & St. Demian; Kellyville
Fr Joshua Tadros
Fr Timothy Besada
St. Mary & St. Marina; Llandilo
Fr Ammonious El-Anba Paula
St. Mary & St. Merkorious; Rhodes
Fr Bishoy Yassa
Fr Youhanna Bestawros
Fr Sharobim Sharobim
Fr Angelos Guirguis
Fr Alexander Aziz
St. Mary & St. Mina's Cathedral; Bexley
Fr Samuel Guirguis
Fr Mikhail Mikhail
Fr Daoud Naguib
Fr Abdelmessih Girgis
Fr Shenouti Gobran
Fr Pishoy-Kamel Selim
St. Mary, St. Pakhomious & St. Shenouda; Kirrawee
Fr Tadros El-Pakhoumi
Fr Pakhomious Erian
Fr John Sorial       
St. Mary & St. Sidhom Pishay; Dural
Fr Arsanious Barsoum
Fr Cyril Abdelmalik
St. Moses the Mighty, St. Maximos & St. Domadios; Goulburn
Fr Yousef Fanous
St. Paul & St. Ruweis; Collaroy
Fr Bassilious Gad
St. Peter & St. Paul; Berkeley (Wollongong)
Fr Moses Ayad
 St. Paul; Blacktown
Fr Pavlos Hanna
Fr Andrew Francis
The Apostles & St. Abanoub; Blacktown
Fr Pavlos Hanna
Fr Athanasius Ibrahim
Fr Philtaous Metri
Fr David ElMasri
Fr Andrew Francis
Theotokos & St Demiana House for Deaconesses; Mount Druitt
Sister Irini
Sister Mary

Queensland
St. Mark & St. George; Strathpine
Fr Bishoy Wassef
St. Mary & St. Anthony Monastery; Kooralbyn
Fr Moussa El-Antony (Abbot)
St. Mary & Archangel Michael Monastery for Nuns; Kooralbyn
Mother Juliana St Demiana
Mother Veronia St Demiana
St. Mary & St. George; Townsville
Fr David Shehata (General Priest - North QLD)
St. Mary & St. Joseph; Coopers Plains
Fr Antony Mansour
St. Mary & St. Kyrillos the Pillar of Faith, Cairns
Fr David Shehata (General Priest - North QLD)
St. Mary & St. Moses the Strong; Bundaberg
Fr Moussa El-Antony
St. Mina & St. Anthony; Helensvale
Fr Abraham Rizk
Virgin Mary; Calamvale
Fr Mettaos Wahba (Vicar - QLD)
Fr David Mahrous
St Mary & St George; Toowoomba
Fr Bishoy Wassef
Fr Abanoub Maximous

Northern Territory
St. Mary, St. Moses the Mighty & St. Takla Haimanot; Darwin
Fr Moussa Beshara

East Asia

Japan
St. Mary & St. Mark; Kyoto

Thailand
St. Mark & St. George; Bangkok
St. James the Apostle Orphanage; Sangkhlaburi
Fr Morris Morris (General Priest - Mission)

Singapore
St. Mark; Singapore

Mainland China
St. Anthony & St. Paul; Guangzhou
St. Mark; Yiwu

Malaysia
St. Mary & St. Mark; Malacca
St. Mary & Archangel Michael; Kuala Lumpur

Indonesia
Mother of the True Light Coptic Orthodox Orphanage; Namorambe Village, Deli Serdang, Medan, Indonesia
Fr Morris Morris (General Priest - Mission)

General Priests 
Fr David Shehata (North QLD)
Fr Morris Morris (Mission)
Fr Mettaous Fakhoury
Fr Timon Abdelmessih

Monastery of St Shenouda the Archmandrite, Putty, New South Wales
Bishop Daniel was ordained Abbot of the Monastery of St Shenouda the Archimandrite, Sydney on 7 June 2009.

, seven monks and two novices live and worship in the monastery:
Fr Shenouda St Shenouda
Fr Theodore St Shenouda
Fr Anthony St Shenouda
Fr Moses St Shenouda
Fr John St Shenouda
Fr Mark St Shenouda 
Fr Paul St Shenouda
Brother Ignatius
Brother Pimen

There are also two monks who serve outside the Monastery on a temporary basis:
Fr Wissa St Shenouda (serving in Canada)
Fr Tadros St Shenouda (serving in Egypt)

Monastery of Virgin Mary for Nuns, Goulburn, New South Wales
The monastery is under the guidance of Pope Tawadros II. It is situated in Goulburn, New South Wales.

, two nuns live and worship in the monastery:
Mother Katrina Virgin Mary
Mother Elisavet Virgin Mary

See also
Copts in Australia

References

External links
Diocese of Melbourne
Diocese of Sydney
Coptic Orthodox Church Directory for Australia
St Shenouda Monastery, New South Wales
St Mary & St. Anthony Monastery, Queensland

Further reading 

 The Coptic Orthodox Church of Australia 1969-1995, by Fr Matthew Attia, formally Mr Maged Attia

 
Oriental Orthodoxy-related lists
Lists of churches in Australia
Australia